Sangam literature is one of the main sources used for documenting the early history of the ancient Tamil country. The ancient Sangam poems mention numerous kings, princes and poets, the existence of some of whom have been confirmed through archaeological evidence. Sangam literature is still the main source for the early Cholas, the Pandyas and the Cheras.

Age of Sangam
     
Sangam was the ancient academy of Tamil poets and authors in the city of Madurai in South India under the patronage of the Pandya kings. It is difficult to estimate the exact date of these Sangam works. Some scholars suggest the historical Sangam literature era spanned from c. 300 BCE to 300 CE.

See also

 Tamiḻakam
 First Sangam
 Second Sangam
 Tamil Sangams
 List of Sangam poets

References

 Nilakanta Sastri, K.A. (1955). A History of South India, OUP, New Delhi (Reprinted 2002).
 South Indian Inscriptions - http://www.whatisindia.com/inscriptions/
 Nagaswamy, R, Roman Karur, Brahadish Publications (1995)
 Krishnamurthy, R Non-Roman Ancient Foreign Coins from Karur in India, Garnet Publishers, Chennai
 Codrington, H. W.  A short History of Ceylon,  London (1926) (http://lakdiva.org/codrington/).
 N. Parameswaran Tamil Guardian 12 October 2005

External links 
 Varalaaru.com – Monthly web magazine on South Indian History and Literature

Chola dynasty
Sangam literature
Tamil history
Historiography of India
Indian poetics
Cultural history of Tamil Nadu